is a passenger railway station in the town of Hokota, Ibaraki Prefecture, Japan operated by the third sector Kashima Rinkai Railway.

Lines
Kitaurakohan Station is served by the Kashima Rinkai Railway’s Ōarai Kashima Line, and is located 34.9 km from the official starting point of the line at Mito Station.

Station layout
The station consists of a single side platform built on an embankment. The platform serves traffic in both directions. There is no station building, and the station is unattended.

History
Kitaurakohan Station was opened on 14 March 1985 with the opening of the Ōarai Kashima Line.

Passenger statistics
In fiscal 2015, the station was used by an average of 42 passengers daily.

Surrounding area
Lake Kasumigaura
Cabinet Satellite Intelligence Center

See also
 List of railway stations in Japan

References

External links

 Kashima Rinkai Testudo Station Information 

Railway stations in Ibaraki Prefecture
Railway stations in Japan opened in 1985
Hokota, Ibaraki